The U.S. state of Pennsylvania has 21 official emblems, as designated by the Pennsylvania General Assembly and signed into law by the Governor of Pennsylvania.

State symbols

See also 
 List of Pennsylvania-related topics
 Lists of United States state insignia

Notes

References

External links

Pennsylvania
State symbols